Saint Paul is an unincorporated community in Fayette County, Illinois, United States.

Notes

Unincorporated communities in Fayette County, Illinois
Unincorporated communities in Illinois